Ajin: Demi-Human is a Japanese manga series written and illustrated by Gamon Sakurai. The opening theme song is "Can You Sleep at Night?" (夜は眠れるかい？/ Yoru wa Nemureru kai?) by Flumpool, and the ending theme is "HOW CLOSE YOU ARE" by Mamoru Miyano. An anime series that follows the anime films premiered on January 16, 2016. A second season premiered on October 8, 2016 and continued the original numbering sequence.
The opening theme song from episodes 1 to 6 is "I am Who I am" (僕は僕であって / Boku wa Boku de Atte ) by Angela X FripSide. The second opening theme song from episode 7 onwards is "The end of escape" by Angela X FripSide. The ending theme song is "At the Edge of the Schoolyard the Wind Blows, Can I Say That Now?" (校庭の隅に二人、風が吹いて今なら言えるかな / Kōtei no Sumi ni Futari, Kaze ga Fuite Ima Nara Ieru ka na) by CreepHyp. The anime series was debuted on Singapore Airlines's inflight entertainment.

Episode list

Season 1

Season 2

OAD
Three OAD (original animation DVD) episodes have been released. The first was released on May 6, 2016, the second on October 7, 2016 and the third on April 7, 2017.

Notes

References

Ajin: Demi-Human